Step On It! is a game that was released in 1996 for the Apple Macintosh and 2002 for Mac OS X. The game was published by Casady & Greene. The game is a puzzle game, with various challenges that are all family friendly.

The player takes control of a robotic man named Ted, and gets through levels by building blocks, solving puzzles, and obtaining keys. This game is based on a much older arcade game called Solomon's Key which is now available on the Wii Virtual Console.

References 

1996 video games
Classic Mac OS games
MacOS games
Puzzle video games
Video games developed in the United States